Senecio arborescens is a flowering plant in the aster family, but the available information about it is mostly conflicting and old.

According to the World Conservation Union, S. arborescens is a native to and widely occurring in the area ranging from Mexico to possibly Colombia. John Claudius Loudon says that S. arborescens is a synonym for Baccharis halimifolia and native of the United States from "Maryland to Florida, on the sea coast" in his 1842 catalog of trees and shrubs and Raymond Taylor agrees with this in his 1952 catalog of Plants of Colonial Days, which also claims that the plant is native to New Jersey and was introduced to Collinson in England from John Bartram in Cape May in 1683. 
And a group of botanists under the discipline of Hieronymum Lentzium seem to have attempted to record the species as a Cacalia when they drew a nice image of a completely different plant for their 1737-1745 catalog.

It is considered a synonym of Telanthophora grandifolia in Plants of the World Online.

References

External links

arborescens
Least concern plants
Endemic flora of the United States
Taxonomy articles created by Polbot
Taxobox binomials not recognized by IUCN